Meyrargues is a commune in the Bouches-du-Rhône department in southern France.

Population

Personalities
Writer Joseph d'Arbaud was born in Meyrargues.
Raouia Rouabhia - Algerian international volleyball player

See also
Communes of the Bouches-du-Rhône department

References

Communes of Bouches-du-Rhône
Bouches-du-Rhône communes articles needing translation from French Wikipedia